Ipswich is a Legislative Assembly of Queensland electoral district on the Brisbane River, west of Brisbane in the Australian state of Queensland. The electorate includes Ipswich and its suburbs, south and east of the Bremer River, west of Bundamba Creek and north of the Cunningham Highway.

History

The electoral district of Town of Ipswich was one of the original 16 established in 1859, when Queensland became a separate colony. It returned 3 members.

In the redistribution of 1872, its name was shortened to just "Ipswich" and it became a single member constituency, due to the creation of the electoral district of Bundamba. In the redistribution of 1878, it absorbed the electoral district of Bremer and became a dual-member constituency.

In 1912, it again reverted to a single member constituency, due to the re-introduction of the single-member electoral district of Bremer.

Members for Ipswich

Election results

References

External links
 

Ipswich